Jerry Tucker (1939 - October 19, 2012) was an American labor leader and educator associated with the United Auto Workers (UAW). He was involved in rank-and-file struggles for union democracy and struggled against union-busting, including leading the UAW's efforts to defeat right-to-work in Missouri in the 1978. 

A month before the 1986 UAW convention, Tucker announced his intention to challenge incumbent Region 5 regional director Kenneth Worley and was fired from his job as assistant regional director. Tucker lost the election, at which delegates had votes proportional to the size of their constituency, by 0.16 votes out of about 650 votes cast.  However, Tucker argued that some delegates had been improperly elected, and the Department of Labor ordered a new election in 1988, which Tucker won with 52% of the vote. He was one of the first members of the UAW's governing Executive Board in decades not to be part of the dominant Administration Caucus.

References

1939 births
2012 deaths
Trade unionists from Missouri
Activists from St. Louis
United Auto Workers people